Michael David Marks (born 23 March 1968) is an English former professional footballer who played in the Football League as a forward.

References

1968 births
Living people
Footballers from Lambeth
English footballers
Association football forwards
Millwall F.C. players
Mansfield Town F.C. players
Leyton Orient F.C. players
Fisher Athletic F.C. players
English Football League players